Judge Jones may refer to:

Barbara S. Jones (born 1947), judge of the United States District Court for the Southern District of New York
Bernard M. Jones (born 1979), judge of the United States District Court for the Western District of Oklahoma
C. Darnell Jones II (born 1949), judge of the United States District Court for the Eastern District of Pennsylvania
Charles Alvin Jones (1887–1966), judge of the United States Court of Appeals for the Third Circuit
Courtney Dunbar Jones (born 1978), judge of the United States Tax Court
Edith Jones (born 1949), chief judge of the United States Court of Appeals for the Fifth Circuit
James G. Jones (1814-1872), Indiana Attorney General who later served as judge of the Indiana Fifteenth Circuit Court
James McHall Jones (1823–1851), judge of the United States District Court for the Southern District of California
James Parker Jones (born 1940), judge of the United States District Court for the Western District of Virginia
John Bailey Jones (born 1927), judge of the United States District Court for the District of South Dakota
John E. Jones III (born 1955), judge of the United States District Court for the Middle District of Pennsylvania
John Marvin Jones (1882–1976), judge of the United States Court of Claims
John Rice Jones (1759–1824), judge of the Missouri Supreme Court
Lake Jones (1867–1930), judge of the United States District Court for the Southern District of Florida
Napoleon A. Jones Jr. (1940–2009), judge of the United States District Court for the Southern District of California
Nathaniel R. Jones (1926–2020), judge of the United States Court of Appeals for the Sixth Circuit
Norman L. Jones (1870–1940), Illinois Circuit Court judge and as Illinois Appellate Court judge before serving on the Illinois Supreme Court
Okla Jones II (1940–2009), judge of the United States District Court for the Southern District of California
Paul Jones (judge) (1880–1965), judge of the United States District Court for the Northern District of Ohio
Richard A. Jones (born 1950), judge of the United States District Court for the Western District of Washington
Robert Clive Jones (born 1947), judge of the United States District Court for the District of Nevada
Robert E. Jones (judge) (born 1927), judge of the United States District Court for the District of Oregon
Robley D. Jones (1860–1917), associate judge of the Maryland First Judicial Court
Shirley Brannock Jones (1925–2019), judge of the United States District Court for the District of Maryland
Steve C. Jones (born 1957), judge of the United States District Court for the Northern District of Georgia
Theodore T. Jones (1944–2012), judge of the New York Court of Appeals
Thomas G. Jones (1844–1914), judge of the United States District Courts for the Middle and Northern Districts of Alabama
Warren Leroy Jones (1895–1993), judge of the United States Court of Appeals for the Fifth Circuit and later for the Eleventh Circuit
William Blakely Jones (1907–1979), judge of the United States District Court for the District of Columbia
William Giles Jones (1808–1883), judge of the United States District Courts for the Norther, Middle, and Southern Districts of Alabama
Woodrow W. Jones (1914–2002), judge of the United States District Court for the Western District of North Carolina

See also
Justice Jones (disambiguation)